Mohammed Hameed Farhan (born 24 January 1993 in Fallujah, Al-Anbar, Iraq) is an Iraqi football goalkeeper who currently plays for Al-Quwa Al-Jawiya in Iraqi Premier League and the Iraq national team. He was the team captain in the 2013 FIFA U-20 World Cup.

Club career
The goalkeeper comes from the Albu Soudah area in the western province of Al-Anbar, Iraq. He first started on the dusty grounds of the Thilth or third playground in his home town playing for the shaabiya team Al-Karama under the coach and school headmaster Mohammed Khalaf Salim before he made his name with Iraqi league club Al-Ramadi FC and then moving onto the city of Baghdad to play for Al-Kahraba in 2009 when he was 16 years of age.

He signed for Al-Kahraba in 2009 and remained for two seasons until he left in 2011 towards Al Shorta, where he first earned a call up to the Iraqi national team. Farhan won the league with Al Shorta before moving to Zakho.

Mohammed was the country's number one keeper in 2014. The ex-Iraqi youth captain was regarded as one of Iraq's best keepers but had to rebuild his career after goalkeeping mistakes against Saudi Arabia during the 2015 Asian Cup qualifying campaign and a calamitous error in an AFC Cup tie in the West Bank saw him dropped by the Iraqi FA and released by Al-Shurta!  

Farhan signed for Zakho  on July 15, 2015. He played the first half of the 2015/16 season with Zakho. He was one of 18 players signed by Zakho at the start of 2015–2016 season, with his contracted ratified by the Iraqi FA on August 24, 2015 however after just two months and 26 days later, he left the Duhok-based club by mutual consent after wanting to move to Al-Talaba in the winter transfer window. However, because of contractual issues, the keeper was unable to sign for the Students and spent the rest of the season without a club!  But was selected for the 2016 Olympic Games in Brazil.

He returned to Al Shorta on February 1.

International career
He made his unofficial international debut in a training game against Malaysia in Ajman in 2013. On 8 October 2013 Farhan made his full international debut against Lebanon national football team in Saida Municipal Stadium  in Beirut, Lebanon. He was substituted-in replacing Noor Sabri in the 46th minute. The match ended 1–1.

Following the 2016 Olympic games , Farhan reunited with Olympic coach Abdul Ghani Shahad and signed for Naft Al-Wasat ahead of the 2016/17 season. He only stayed for half a season before being on the move once again. There have been persistent rumours behind the scenes that the Iraqi coach had only selected players for the final Olympic squad based on agreeing to sign for Naft Al-Wasat where Abdul Ghani Shahad would manage the following season, with Mohammed Hamed one of those players.

Honours

Clubs
Al-Shorta
 Iraqi Premier League: 2012–13, 2018–19
 Iraqi Super Cup: 2019

International
Iraq Youth
 AFC U-19 Championship runner-up: 2012 
 FIFA U-20 World Cup fourth-place: 2013
Iraq
 Arab Nations Cup bronze medallist: 2012
 WAFF Championship runner-up: 2012
 Arabian Gulf Cup runner-up: 2013 
 AFC Asian Cup fourth-place: 2015

References

External links
 Player's profile on Goalzz.com

Iraqi footballers
Living people
1993 births
People from Fallujah
Association football goalkeepers
Footballers at the 2014 Asian Games
2015 AFC Asian Cup players
2019 AFC Asian Cup players
Iraq international footballers
Asian Games medalists in football
Al-Shorta SC players
Footballers at the 2016 Summer Olympics
Olympic footballers of Iraq
Asian Games bronze medalists for Iraq
Medalists at the 2014 Asian Games